is a 1983 Japanese film directed by Taku Shinjō based on a novel by Mineo Higashi.

Awards and nominations
26th Blue Ribbon Awards
 Won: Best Actor - Ken Ogata

References

1983 films
1980s Japanese-language films
Films set in Okinawa Prefecture
1980s Japanese films